Dzharylhach (Cyrillic: Джарилгач, also spelled as Dzharylgach) is a sand bank in Skadovsk Raion, Kherson Oblast near Crimea in Ukraine. Along with the Tendra island that lies to the west, in the past it was a spit that Greeks called "Course of Achilles". To the west it stretches as a spit and as a shoal, which sometimes dries up, and connects to the continental portion of Kherson Oblast near the town of Lazurne. The wider portion used to be called Tamyraca. It was named after an ancient town of Tamyraca located on the continent across the bay.

Across from the island over the Dzharylhach Bay is the city of Skadovsk. Dzharylhach and its bay is part of the Dzharylhak National Nature Park.

Its area of 56 square km and length of 42 km make it the Black Sea's biggest sand bank, located at the Karkinit Bay. The island has clean sandy beaches and mineral springs. In the middle of the island there is a fresh water spring, and more than four hundred small salty lakes are scattered all over its territory. The unique flora and fauna of Dzharylhach have been well preserved. It is a habitat for wild boars, deer, mouflon, as well as numerous seagulls and cormorant, hunting crabs, raps whelk and shrimp.

Gallery

References

 zatyshny.com.ua
 brama.com
 Photo gallery of Dzharylgach island 

Geography of Kherson Oblast
Islands of Ukraine
Islands of the Black Sea
Skadovsk Raion
Spits of Ukraine
Spits of the Black Sea